Bernardo de Sá Nogueira de Figueiredo, 1st Marquess de Sá da Bandeira (26 September 1795, in Santarém – 6 January 1876, in Lisbon) was a Portuguese nobleman and politician. He served as Prime Minister of Portugal for five times. He was the most prominent Portuguese defender of the abolition of slavery in Portugal and its domains.

Life 

Sá Nogueira de Figueiredo was born in Santarém in 1795 to Faustino José Lopes Nogueira de Figueiredo e Silva (1767–1830) and Francisca Xavier de Sá Mendonça Cabral da Cunha Godinho (1772–1829). Sá Nogueira de Figueiredo supported the liberal party during the Liberal Wars (1828–1834), and took part in the landing at Mindelo in July 1832. He fought in the Siege of Porto and was wounded in his right arm, which had to be amputated.

Sá da Bandeira was Minister of the Navy in the government of José Jorge Loureiro (1835–36). He was Prime Minister of Portugal for five terms:
5 November 1836 – 1 June 1837
10 August 1837 – 18 April 1839
17 April 1865 – 5 September 1865
22 July 1868 – 11 August 1869
29 August – 29 October 1870

He never married but he had a legitimised daughter born out of wedlock, named Luísa Aglaé Fanny de Sá Nogueira, who married her cousin Faustino de Paiva de Sá Nogueira. The city of Lubango, Angola, was called Sá de Bandeira when the Angolan territory was under Portuguese rule.

On 4 April 1833, he was created Baron of Sá da Bandeira, on 1 December 1834, he was created Viscount of Sá da Bandeira and on 3 February 1864, he was created Marquis of Sá da Bandeira. He was also a freemason.

See also
Belenzada
Rossio massacre

References

1795 births
1876 deaths
People from Santarém, Portugal
Prime Ministers of Portugal
Finance ministers of Portugal
Margraves of Sá da Bandeira
Viscounts of Sá da Bandeira
Military personnel of the Liberal Wars
19th-century Portuguese people
Portuguese nobility
Naval ministers of Portugal